Leo Taylor (October 27, 1948 – January 29, 2017)  was an American football halfback who played for the Calgary Stampeders. He won the Grey Cup with them in 1971. He played college football at North Texas State University, now known as the University of North Texas.

References

1948 births
2017 deaths
Calgary Stampeders players
North Texas Mean Green football players
American football running backs
Canadian football running backs
American players of Canadian football
People from El Campo, Texas